Tranter may refer to:

 Clement John Tranter
 George Tranter (footballer, born 1886) (1886–1958), English footballer
George Tranter (footballer, born 1915) (1915–1998), English footballer
 Jane Tranter
 John Tranter
 Nigel Tranter
 Penny Tranter
 Richard Tranter (1893–1957), English footballer
 William Tranter
 Walter Tranter

See also
 Battle of Tranter's Creek
 Tranter (revolver)